The 1984 New York City Marathon was the 15th edition of the New York City Marathon and took place in New York City on 28 October.

Results

Men

Women

References

External links

New York City Marathon, 1984
Marathon
New York City Marathon
New York